This is a list of members of the Argentine Senate from 10 December 2017 to 9 December 2019.

Composition

Election cycles

List of senators

The table is sorted by provinces in alphabetical order, and then with their senators in alphabetical order by their surnames. All senators start their term on December 10, and end it on December 9 of the corresponding years, except when noted.

Notes

References

External links
Official site 

2017
2017 in Argentina
2018 in Argentina
2019 in Argentina